ATP-binding cassette super-family G member 2 is a protein that in humans is encoded by the ABCG2 gene. ABCG2 has also been designated as CDw338 (cluster of differentiation w338). ABCG2 is a translocation protein used to actively pump drugs and other compounds against their concentration gradient using the bonding and hydrolysis of ATP as the energy source.

ABCG2 forms into a homodimer to assume its active transport conformation. The dimer weighs approximately 144 kDa. The expression of this transport protein is highly conserved throughout the animal kingdom, pointing to its importance.

Substrate binding with compounds occurs in the large central cavity. ABCG2 can bind to a broad range of compounds but binds strongest to flat, polycyclic chemicals with lots of hydrophobic character.

Function 

The membrane-associated protein encoded by this gene is included in the superfamily of ATP-binding cassette (ABC) transporters. ABC proteins transport various molecules across extra- and intra-cellular membranes. The active transport of chemicals requires a source of energy to catalyze the conformational changes the protein undergoes. The nucleotide-binding domains (NBDs) found towards the N-terminus allow binding to ATP molecules. The NBD and the transmembrane domain (TMD) are the most conserved region of the transporter in various animal groups, highlighting the importance of these regions for overall protein function. Additionally, many ABC transporters have conserved NBD regions showing the strict conformation needed to bind ATP molecules.

ABC genes are divided into seven distinct subfamilies (ABC1, MDR/TAP, MRP, ALD, OABP, GCN20, White). This protein is a member of the White subfamily. Alternatively referred to as the breast cancer resistance protein (BCRP), this protein functions as a xenobiotic transporter which may play a role in multi-drug resistance to chemotherapeutic agents including mitoxantrone and camptothecin analogues. Early observations of significant ABCG2-mediated resistance to anthracyclines were subsequently attributed mutations encountered in vitro but not in nature or the clinic. Significant expression of this protein has been observed in the placenta, and it has been shown to have a role in protecting the fetus from xenobiotics in the maternal circulation.

The transporter has been shown to play protective roles in blocking absorption at the apical membrane of the intestine, and at the blood-testis barrier, the blood–brain barrier, and the membranes of hematopoietic progenitor and other stem cells. At the apical membranes of the liver and kidney, it enhances excretion of xenobiotics. In the lactating mammary gland, it has a role on excreting vitamins such as riboflavin and biotin into milk. Xenobiotic toxins compete for the substrate binding domain of ABCG2 potentially causing toxins to concentrate in the breast milk. In the kidney and gastrointestinal tract, it has a role in urate excretion.

The protein also carries the Jr(a) antigen, which defines the Junior blood group system.

Interactive pathway map

Inhibition
It is inhibited by some calcium channel blockers such as amlodipine, felodipine and nifedipine. The fungal toxin fumitremorgin C (FTC) inhibits the protein but has neurotoxic side effects. A synthetic tetracyclic analog of FTC called Ko-143 inhibits ABCG2.

See also 
 ATP-binding cassette transporter

References

Further reading

External links 
 
 
 

Clusters of differentiation
ATP-binding cassette transporters